Lawrence Charles Paulson  (born 1955) is an American computer scientist. He is a Professor of Computational Logic at the University of Cambridge Computer Laboratory and a Fellow of Clare College, Cambridge.

Education
Paulson graduated from the California Institute of Technology in 1977, and obtained his PhD in Computer Science from Stanford University in 1981 for research on programming languages and compiler-compilers supervised by John L. Hennessy.

Research
Paulson came to the University of Cambridge in 1983 and became a Fellow of Clare College, Cambridge in 1987. He is best known for the cornerstone text on the programming language ML, ML for the Working Programmer. His research is based around the interactive theorem prover Isabelle, which he introduced in 1986. He has worked on the verification of cryptographic protocols using inductive definitions, and he has also formalised the constructible universe of Kurt Gödel. Recently he has built a new theorem prover, MetiTarski, for real-valued special functions.

Paulson teaches an undergraduate lecture course in the Computer Science Tripos, entitled Logic and Proof which covers automated theorem proving and related methods. (He used to teach Foundations of Computer Science which introduces functional programming, but this course was taken over by Alan Mycroft and Amanda Prorok in 2017, and then Anil Madhavapeddy and Amanda Prorok in 2019.)

Awards and honours
Paulson was elected a Fellow of the Royal Society (FRS) in 2017, a Fellow of the Association for Computing Machinery in 2008 and a Distinguished Affiliated Professor for Logic in Informatics at the Technical University of Munich.

Personal life
Paulson has two children by his first wife, Dr Susan Mary Paulson, who died in 2010. Since 2012, he has been married to Dr Elena Tchougounova.

References

1955 births
Living people
American computer scientists
Members of the University of Cambridge Computer Laboratory
California Institute of Technology alumni
Stanford University alumni
Fellows of Clare College, Cambridge
Fellows of the Association for Computing Machinery
Fellows of the Royal Society
Formal methods people